The Best of Everything (1958) is Rona Jaffe's first novel. It is the story of five young employees of a New York publishing company.

Development history
The novel was one of the first to be bought for film adaptation before the manuscript had been edited so the film company would be involved in the marketing of the book. It was also one of the first novels to use the author as a marketing tool—complete with full-color jacket photography of author Rona Jaffe by photographer Philippe Halsman.

Adaptations
In 1959, the novel was adapted into a film of the same name released by Twentieth Century Fox directed by Jean Negulesco and starring Diane Baker, Hope Lange, Stephen Boyd, Suzy Parker, Robert Evans, Brian Aherne and Joan Crawford. Longtime Fox music director Alfred Newman wrote the final musical score of his contract with the studio for the film.

The novel was also adapted into a soap opera of the same name written by James Lipton. The show aired on ABC from March 30 to September 25, 1970.

An off-Broadway play adaptation of the novel, adapted and directed by Julie Kramer, opened in  October 2012 at HERE Arts Center in New York.

References

1958 American novels
American novels adapted into films
American novels adapted into plays
American novels adapted into television shows
Novels set in New York City
Jewish American novels
Simon & Schuster books
1958 debut novels